Douglas Walton may refer to:

 Douglas Walton (actor) (1909–1961), Canadian actor
 Doug Walton (cricketer) (1927–2001), Australian cricketer
 Douglas N. Walton (1942–2020), Canadian academic
 Doug Walton (rugby league) (c.1946–2012), English rugby league player

See also
Albert D. Walton (Albert Douglas Walton, 1886–1951), US Attorney for the state of Wyoming
Douglas Wolton (1898–1988), British communist activist